= Fletcher–Salmons Building =

Historic building in San Diego

Coordinates: 32.715896°N 117.159125°W

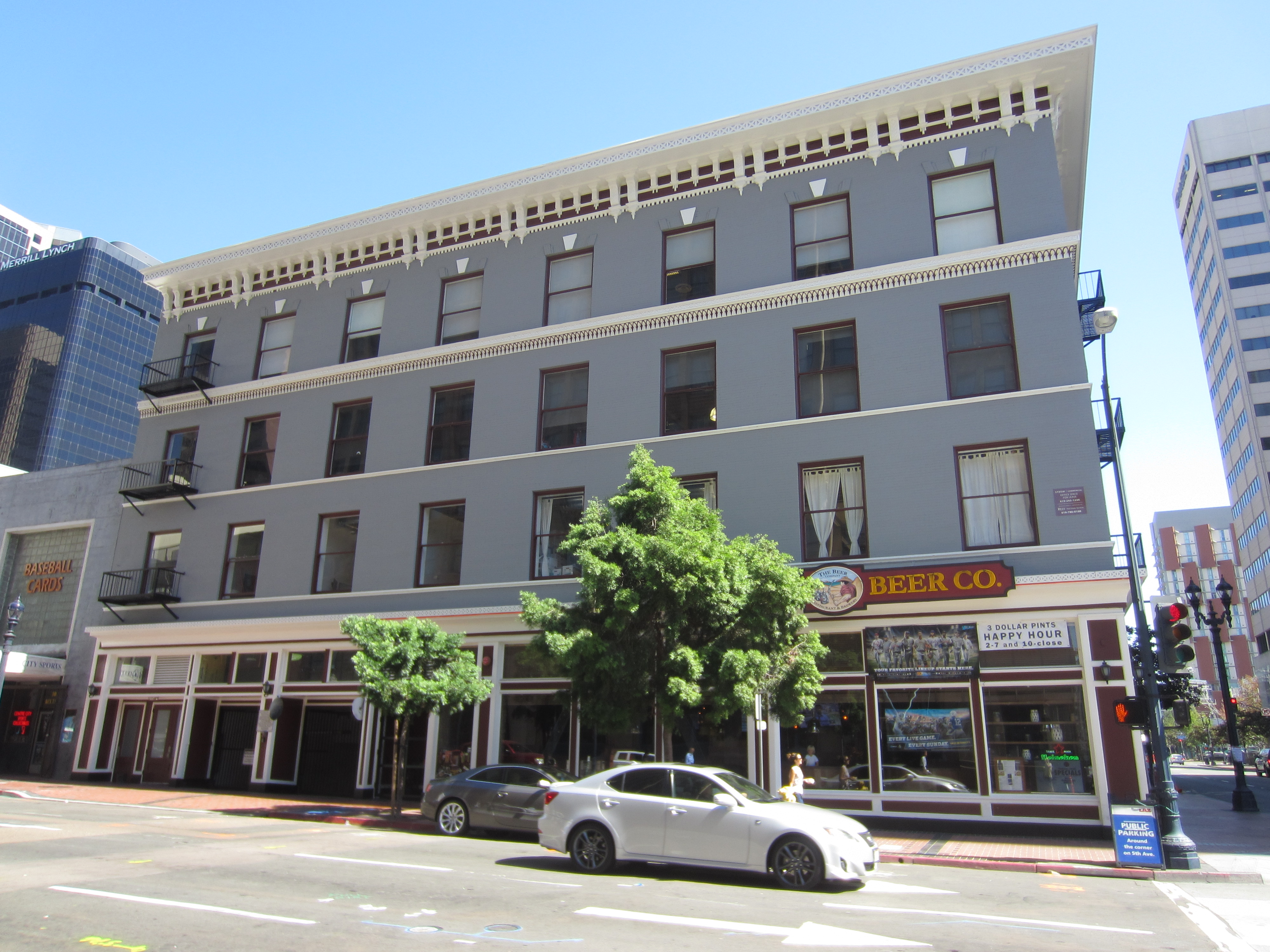
- The building's exterior in 2016
- Interactive map of the Fletcher–Salmons Building area

The Fletcher–Salmons Building is a historic building in San Diego, California, United States.
